Eulimidae is a family of very small parasitic sea snails, marine gastropod mollusks in the superfamily Vanikoroidea.

Description 

These small parasitic snails live on (or in some cases in) the bodies of echinoderms such as sea cucumbers, sea urchins, sea stars, etc. All species lack a radula, in most cases possessing a proboscis which they extend into their host's body cavity in order to feed.

Genera
Genera within the family Eulimidae include:

 Abyssoaclis Barros et al., 2003
 Aclis S.L. Lovén, 1846
 Acrochalix Bouchet & Warén, 1986
 Amamibalcis Kuroda & Habe, 1950
 Annulobalcis Habe, 1965
 Apicalia A. Adams, 1862
 Arcuella G. Nevill & H. Nevill, 1874
 Asterolamia Warén, 1980
 Asterophila Randall & Heath, 1912
 Auriculigerina Dautzenberg, 1925
 Austrorissopsis Grant-Mackie & Chapman-Smith, 1971
 Awanuia Powell, 1927   
 Bacula H. Adams & A. Adams, 1863
 Batheulima F. Nordsieck, 1968
 Bathycrinicola Bouchet & Warén, 1986
 Bulimeulima Bouchet & Warén, 1986
 Campylorhaphion Bouchet & Warén, 1986
 Chileutomia Tate & Cossman, 1898
 Clypeastericola Warén, 1994
 Concavibalcis Warén, 1980
 Costaclis Bartsch, 1947
 Crinolamia Bouchet & Warén, 1979
 Crinophtheiros Bouchet & Warén, 1986
 Curveulima Laseron, 1955
 Cyclonidea C. F. Laseron, 1956
 Diacolax Mandahl-Barth, 1946
 Discaclis Moolenbeek & Warén, 1987
 Echineulima Lützen & Nielsen, 1975
 Echiuroidicola Warén, 1980
 Enteroxenos Bonnevie, 1902
 Entocolax Voigt, 1888
 Entoconcha J. Muller, 1852
 Ersilia Monterosato, 1872
 Eulima Risso, 1826
 Eulimacrostoma Leonardo Santos de Souza, Alexandre Dias Pimenta, 2019 
 Eulimetta Warén, 1992
 Eulimostraca Bartsch, 1917
 Eulitoma Laseron, 1955
 Fuscapex Warén, 1981
 Fusceulima Laseron, 1955
 Gasterosiphon Koehler & Vaney, 1905
 Goodingia Lützen, 1972
 Goriella Moolenbeek, 2008
 Goubinia Dautzenberg, 1923
 Haliella Monterosato, 1878
 Halielloides Bouchet & Warén, 1986
 Hebeulima Laseron, 1955
 Hemiaclis G. O. Sars, 1878
 Hemiliostraca Pilsbry, 1917
 Hoenselaaria Moolenbeek, 2009
 Hoplopteron P. Fischer, 1876
 Hypermastus Pilsbry, 1899
 Larochella A.W.B. Powell, 1927
 Margineulima Cossmann, 1888
 Megadenus Rosén, 1910
 Melanella Bowdich, 1822
 Menon Hedley, 1900
 Microeulima Waren, 1992
 Molpadicola Grusov, 1957
 Monogamus Lützen, 1976
 Mucronalia A. Adams, 1860
 Nanobalcis Waren & Mifsud, 1990
 Niso Risso, 1826
 Oceanida de Folin, 1870
 Ophieulima Warén & Sibuet, 1981
 Ophioarachnicola Warén, 1980
 Ophiolamia Warén & Carney, 1981
 Paedophoropus Ivanov, 1933
 Palisadia Laseron, 1956
 Paramegadenus Humphreys & Lützen, 1972
 Parastilbe Cossman, 1900
 Parvioris Warén, 1981
 Peasistilifer Warén, 1980
 Pelseneeria Koehler & Vaney, 1908
 Pictobalcis Laseron, 1955
 Pisolamia Bouchet & Lützen, 1976
 Polygireulima Sacco, 1892
 Prostilifer Warén, 1980
 Pseudosabinella McLean, 1995
 Pulicicochlea Ponder & Gooding, 1978
 Punctifera Warén, 1981
 Pyramidelloides Nevill 1884
 Rectilabrum Bouchet & Warén, 1986
 Robillardia E.A. Smith, 1889
 † Rostreulima Cossmann, 1913
 Ruapukea R.K. Dell, 1952
 Sabinella Monterosato, 1890
 Sanciaella Moolenbeek & Hoenselaar, 2010
 Scalaribalcis Warén, 1980
 Scalaronoba A.W.B. Powell, 1927
 Scalenostoma Deshayes, 1863
 Selma A. Adams, 1863
 † Semistylifer Cossmann, 1921
 Severnsia Geiger, 2016
 Sticteulima Laseron, 1955
 Stilapex Iredale, 1925
 Stilifer Broderip [in Broderip & Sowerby], 1832
 Subniso McLean, 2000
 Teretianax Iredale, 1918
 Thaleia Waren, 1979
 Thyca H. Adams & A. Adams, 1854
 Thyonicola Mandahl-Barth, 1941
 Trochostilifer Warén, 1980
 Tropiometricola Warén, 1981
 Turveria Berry, 1956
 Umbilibalcis Bouchet & Waren, 1986
 Vitreobalcis Warén, 1980
 Vitreolina Monterosato, 1884

Genera brought into synonymy
 Acicularia Monterosato, 1884: synonym of Polygireulima Sacco, 1892
 Athleenia Bartsch, 1946: synonym of Oceanida de Folin, 1870
 Balcis Leach, 1847: synonym of Melanella Bowdich, 1822
 Bessomia Berry, 1959: synonym of Thyca H. Adams & A. Adams, 1854
 Bonellia Deshayes, 1838: synonym of Niso Risso, 1826
 Chryseulima Laseron, 1955: synonym of Apicalia A. Adams, 1862
 Comenteroxenos Tikasingh, 1961: synonym of Enteroxenos Bonnevie, 1902
 Cuspeulima Laseron, 1955: synonym of Eulima Risso, 1826
 Entosiphon Koehler & Vaney, 1903: synonym of Gasterosiphon Koehler & Vaney, 1905
 Eulimaustra Laseron, 1955: synonym of Melanella Bowdich, 1822
 Eulimitra Laseron, 1955: synonym of Hemiliostraca Pilsbry, 1917
 Eulimoda Laseron, 1955: synonym of Sabinella Monterosato, 1890
 Granulithyca Habe, 1976: synonym of Thyca H. Adams & A. Adams, 1854
 Halliella Monterosato, 1878: synonym of Haliella Monterosato, 1878
 Helicosyrinx Baur, 1864: synonym of Entoconcha J. Müller, 1852
 Hersilia Monterosato, 1884: synonym of Ersilia Monterosato, 1872
 Hoplopteropsis de Morgan, 1916: synonym of Oceanida de Folin, 1870
 Hyperlia Pilsbry, 1918: synonym of Scalenostoma Deshayes, 1863
 Kiramodulus Kuroda, 1949: synonym of Thyca H. Adams & A. Adams, 1854
 Lambertia Souverbie, 1869: synonym of Stilapex Iredale, 1925
 Leiostraca H. Adams & A. Adams, 1853: synonym of Eulima Risso, 1826
 Lentigobalcis Habe, 1961: synonym of Sticteulima Laseron, 1955
 Luetzenia Rehder, 1980: synonym of Robillardia E.A. Smith, 1889
 Luetzenia Warén, 1980: synonym of Echineulima Lützen & Nielsen, 1975
 Neovolusia Emerson, 1965: synonym of Niso Risso, 1826
 Paedophorus Ivanov, 1933: synonym of Paedophoropus Ivanov, 1933
 Parastilifer A.V. Ivanov, 1952: synonym of Pelseneeria Koehler & Vaney, 1908
 Parenteroxenos A.V. Ivanov, 1945: synonym of Thyonicola Mandahl-Barth, 1941
 Rosenia Nierstrasz, 1913: synonym of Pelseneeria Koehler & Vaney, 1908
 Spiroclimax Mörch, 1875: synonym of Oceanida de Folin, 1870
 Stilimella Laseron, 1955: synonym of Scalenostoma Deshayes, 1863
 Strombiformis Da Costa, 1778: synonym of Eulima Risso, 1826
 Stylapex: synonym of Stilapex Iredale, 1925
 Stylifer Cossmann, 1921: synonym of Stilifer Broderip [in Broderip & Sowerby I], 1832
 Stylina Fleming, 1828: synonym of Pelseneeria Koehler & Vaney, 1908
 Subeulima Souverbie, 1875: synonym of Bacula H. Adams & A. Adams, 1863
 Subularia Monterosato, 1884: synonym of Eulima Risso, 1826
 Teretianax Iredale, 1918: synonym of Pyramidelloides G. Nevill, 1885
 Subfamily Thycinae: synonym of Eulimidae
 Turtonia Rosén, 1910: synonym of Pelseneeria Koehler & Vaney, 1908
 Venustilifer Powell, 1939: synonym of Pelseneeria Koehler & Vaney, 1908
 Volusia A. Adams, 1851: synonym of Niso Risso, 1826

References

Further reading 
 Tryon G. W. 1886. Manual of Conchology. Volume 8. Naticidae, Capyptraeidae, Turritellidae, Vermetidae, Caecidae, Eulimidae, Turbonillidae, Pyramidellidae. 461 pp., 79 plates. page 258, plate 68
 Warrèn Anders, 1984, A generic revision of the family Eulimidae (Gastropoda, Prosobranchia), The Journal of Molluscan Studies, Supplement 13 1-96
 Vaught, K.C. (1989). A classification of the living Mollusca. American Malacologists: Melbourne, FL (USA). . XII, 195 pp.
 
 Takano, T.; Kano, Y. (2014). Molecular phylogenetic investigations of the relationships of the echinoderm-parasite family Eulimidae within Hypsogastropoda (Mollusca). Molecular Phylogenetics and Evolution. 79: 258-269. Note: States that Eulimidae are a member of superfamily Vanikoroidea, on the basis of sequence data. This placement implies synonymy of the superfamilies Eulimoidea and Vanikoroidea

External links 
 Marine Identification Portal: Eulimidae
 
 Miocene Gastropods and Biostratigraphy of the Kern River Area, California; United States Geological Survey Professional Paper 642 
 Worldwide Mollusc Species Data Base: Eulimidae
 

 
Vanikoroidea